The Queen's Award for Enterprise: Sustainable Development (Innovation Technology) (2011) was awarded on 21 April 2011, by Queen Elizabeth II.

The following organisations were awarded this year.

Recipients 

AGD Systems Limited of Staverton, Cheltenham for	AGD94X series pedestrian nearside signals.
ARM Holdings plc of Cambridge for licensing of technology to partners globally for low energy chips for digital electronics.
J C Bamford Excavators Limited of Rocester, Staffordshire for lock-up torque converter fitted to backhoe loader saving fuel, emissions and travel time.
BBC Research & Development of London for the Piero sports graphics system – a tool for sports analysis on TV using 3D graphics and real-time image processing.
Brandon Medical Company Limited of Leeds, West Yorkshire for HD-LED lighting with ultra high efficiency and near perfect colour rendition across the visible spectrum.
Cambridge Consultants of Cambridge for Prism 200 – a handheld through-wall radar for counter-terrorist applications.
Checkmate Lifting & Safety LLP of Sheerness, Kent for Xcalibre fall arrest blocks to protect from falls from height.
Conwy Valley Systems Limited of Conwy for PETROG – petrographic data capture, management, analysis and reporting.
Datapath Limited of Derby for innovative video graphics and capture technology for custom and professional applications.
DotEcon Limited of London for Design and implementation of novel online auctions for radio spectrum and other uses globally.
DuPont Teijin Films UK Limited of Middlesbrough for high performance Melinex® polyester films for solar photovoltaic modules.
EA Technology Limited of Capenhurst, Cheshire for UltraTEV products assessing the condition of high and medium voltage assets in power generation, transmission and distribution.
ECOSYL Products Limited of Stokesley, North Yorkshire for ECOSYL ULV and ECOSYL 100 ultra-low volume biological inoculants for treatment and enhancement of forage for cows and sheep.
FFEI Limited of Hemel Hempstead, Hertfordshire for low cost composite resin internal drum platesetter for emerging markets.
Harvard Engineering PLC of Normanton, Wakefield for LeafNut central monitoring and wireless control system for street lighting.
i2 Ltd of Fulbourn, Cambridgeshire for the Intelligence-Led Operations Platform providing transformational technology for intelligence acquisition, management, analysis / visualization and communication.
International Health Partners (UK) Limited of Wadhurst, East Sussex for innovation in new forms of donated medical aid.
Jagex of Cambridge for RuneScape, a  free-to-play online Massively Multiplayer Online (MMO) game
Linemark (UK) Limited of Rawtenstall, Lancashire for the Impact Paint System used in the sports marking industry.
Molecular Profiles Limited of Nottingham for nanoPASS – an innovation for the development of pharmaceutical products.
The National Archives of Kew, Richmond for digital archiving technology and consulting software services.
Payne Security (a division of Filtrona C & SP Limited) of Giltbrook, Nottingham for a covert, highly secure authentication and government excise protection system.
Peak NDT Limited of Derby for design, development and exploitation of the Micropulse 5 series of ultrasonic NDT controllers.
Probrand of Hockley, Birmingham for innovation in buyside price comparison technology enabling best value and dynamic marketplaces.
Radio Design Limited of Shipley, West Yorkshire for the Universal Combiner Unit,  allowing multiple cellular operator companies to share a common antenna system.
READ Well Services Limited of Aberdeen for Hydraulically Expandable Tubular Systems, offering flexible design solutions for drilling, completion and well integrity issues.
RealVNC Limited of Cambridge for innovation in VNC remote access software that allows users to connect and control one computer from another.
Red Bee Media Limited (Piero Division) of London for the Piero sports graphics system – a tool for sports analysis on TV using 3D graphics and real-time image processing.
Renishaw plc of Wotton under Edge, Gloucestershire for the TRS2 broken tool detection system.
Roke Manor Research Limited of Romsey, Hampshire for Resolve, a modular manpack electronic warfare system for the exploitation and suppression of hostile communication equipment.
SecurEnvoy Limited of Reading, Berkshire for being the inventors and vendors of tokenless two-factor authentication.
Selex Galileo, Radar & Advanced Targeting of Edinburgh for innovation in the design and production of military lasers providing imaging, range finding and designation capabilities.
Sentec Limited of Cambridge for Sterling, an optimum platform for smart water meters, featuring solid state, durable and accurate metrology.
Smiths Detection Watford Limited of Bushey, Hertfordshire for design and manufacturer of the Lightweight Chemical Detector Series.
Soil Machine Dynamics Limited of Wallsend, Tyne and Wear for design and manufacture of work-class remotely operated vehicles (WROVs).
Solarcentury Holdings Limited of London for C21e solar electric roof tiles and slates.
Specialised Imaging Limited of Tring, Hertfordshire for ultra high speed imaging systems for research, industrial, military and scientific applications.
Spectrum Brands (UK) Limited of Washington, Tyne and Wear for a mercury-free hearing aid battery and innovations to increase capacity, quality and production processes.
Survival Craft Inspectorate Limited of Findon, Aberdeen for Safelaunch, a quick-release lifeboat launch system.
Tessella plc of Abingdon, Oxfordshire for digital archiving technology and consulting software services.
Trident Sensors Limited of Cranleigh, Surrey for innovation in the design of the Polaris GPS tracker and data communications system.
Vernacare Limited of Bolton, Lancashire for the single use washbowl made from biodegradable pulp, used to prevent healthcare acquired infections.
Volumatic Limited of Coventry for CounterCache Intelligent and the TruPouch – innovations in secure handling and management of cash by retailers.
Zeeko Limited of Coalville, Leicestershire for the Optics Fabrication Centre, an innovative ultra-precision corrective polisher range with integrated metrology.

References

Queen's Award for Enterprise: Innovation (Technology)
2011 awards in the United Kingdom